Australia's  Strongest Man is an annual strongman contest consisting of exclusively Australian strength athletes. The event was established in 1993. The first inaugural winner was Bill Lyndon, who preceded a number of different Australian strength athletes until the current date.

Official results - top three places

Results courtesy of Aussiepower Official website

See also

List of strongman competitions

References

1993 establishments in Australia
Recurring sporting events established in 1993
National strongmen competitions
Sports competitions in Australia